"Free and independent Artsakh" is the national anthem of the Republic of Artsakh, a breakaway state in Transcaucasia. Adopted in 1992, the anthem was written by Vardan Hakobyan and composed by Armen Nasibyan.

Lyrics

Notes

References

External links
 Symbols of Statehood – The website for the Government of Nagorno-Karabakh has a page on national symbols that include an instrumental version of the anthem.
 State Symbols – The website for the President of the NKR also has a page on state symbols that features an English translation of the lyrics along with the same instrumental version.

National anthems of the Commonwealth of Unrecognized States
Armenian culture
Asian anthems
Nagorno-Karabakh
Republic of Artsakh
European anthems